Italian Race is a 2016 Italian sports-drama film written and directed by Matteo Rovere. It is loosely based on the true story of rally racing driver Carlo Capone.

Plot 
The passion for engines has always flowed in Giulia De Martino's veins. She comes from a family that has been producing motor racing champions for generations. She too is a driver, an exceptional talent who, at the age of seventeen, took part in the GT Championship, under the guidance of her father Mario.

But one day everything changes and Giulia finds herself having to face the track and life alone.

Complicating the situation is the unexpected return of her brother Loris, a former driver by now totally unreliable, but with an extraordinary sixth sense for driving. They will be forced to work together, in a succession of adrenaline and emotions that will make them discover how difficult and important it is to try to be a family.

Cast 
Stefano Accorsi as Loris De Martino
Matilda De Angelis as Giulia De Martino
Paolo Graziosi as Tonino
Roberta Mattei as Annarella
Lorenzo Gioielli as Ettore Minotti
Giulio Pugnaghi as Nico De Martino

Reception

Italian Race grossed $2,412,312 at the box office.

See also  
 List of Italian films of 2016

References

External links

2016 films
Italian auto racing films
2010s sports drama films
Italian sports drama films
Films set in Emilia-Romagna
Films shot in Matera
Films directed by Matteo Rovere
2016 drama films
2010s Italian films
Fandango (Italian company) films
Rai Cinema films